The election for Resident Commissioner to the United States House of Representatives took place on November 7,2000, the same day as the larger Puerto Rican general election and the United States elections, 2000.

Candidates for Resident Commissioner
 Carlos Romero Barcelo for the New Progressive Party
 Manuel Rodríguez Orellana for the Puerto Rican Independence Party
 Aníbal Acevedo Vilá for the Popular Democratic Party

Election results

See also 
Puerto Rican general election, 2000

References 

2000 Puerto Rico elections
Puerto Rico
2000